Krzysztof Jan Śmiszek (born 25 August 1979) is a Polish lawyer, politician, human rights activist and university lecturer. He has been a member of the Sejm (9th term) since 2019.

Biography

Education 
In 2003 he graduated from the Faculty of Law and Administration at the University of Warsaw. In 2006 he graduated from the Postgraduate Studies in European Law at the University of Warsaw. In 2016, he obtained the degree of doctor of legal sciences in the discipline of law at the Faculty of Law and Administration of the University of Warsaw based on the thesis entitled European equality standard and Polish law. Material and institutional aspect, written under the direction of Mirosław Wyrzykowski, specializing in European law.

Professional activity 
In the years 2003–2005 he worked as a lawyer in the Office of the Government Plenipotentiary for Equal Status of Women and Men Izabela Jaruga-Nowacka and Magdalena Środa, where he was involved in the analysis and practical application of anti-discrimination legislation. For several years he was the head of the Legal Group of the Campaign Against Homophobia Association. In the years 2008–2010 he worked in Brussels as a lawyer and program coordinator at Equinet - European Network of Equality Bodies. In the years 2011–2016 he was a researcher at the Human Rights Department of the Faculty of Law and Administration at the University of Warsaw.

Since 2017 he is a lecturer at the Faculty of Law, Administration and International Relations at the Krakow Academy Andrzej Frycz Modrzewski. In 2018, he was a scholarship holder of the University of Michigan, the Weiser Center for Europe and Eurasia. He gave guest lectures, including at the University of Toronto and the University of Texas at Austin.

Political activity 

In 2019, he became involved in the political party Spring. In the elections to the European Parliament 2019, he unsuccessfully applied for a seat in the EP.

In the parliamentary elections in 2019, he was elected a deputy to the Sejm of the Republic of Poland of the 9th term, gaining 43,447 votes. He was elected one of seven vice-chairmen of the Left parliamentary club. In November 2019, he was elected chairman of the newly formed LGBT+ Parliamentary Group on Equal Opportunity, in addition to being a member of the Justice and Human Rights Committee and the European Union Committee. He is also a member of the Polish delegation to the Parliamentary Assembly of the Council of Europe.

Personal life 
Since 2002 he has been in a relationship with politician, political scientist and Spring political party leader Robert Biedroń.

References

1979 births
Living people
University of Warsaw alumni
Spring (political party) politicians
Members of the Polish Sejm 2019–2023
Lawyers from Warsaw
Gay politicians
Polish LGBT politicians
LGBT lawyers
People from Stalowa Wola
Polish LGBT rights activists
21st-century Polish lawyers
21st-century Polish politicians
LGBT legislators